James "Jimmy" Golden (born August 1, 1950) is an American professional wrestler. He is best known for his tenure with World Championship Wrestling (WCW) under the ring name Bunkhouse Buck. He also appeared in WWE as Jack Swagger Sr.

A member of the Golden wrestling family, he is the son of Billy Golden and the father of Bobby Golden. Golden's cousins are Robert and Ron Fuller, and he is the uncle of Eddie and Evan Golden. His grandfather is Roy Welch and his uncle is Buddy Fuller.

Professional wrestling career

Jimmy Golden started wrestling in 1969 in his father (Billy Golden)'s territory in Alabama. He started teaming with his cousin Robert Fuller in the 1970s and last teamed together on the independent circuit in 2005. Golden also wrestled in the early 1970s in Australia for Jim Barnett.

Jimmy Golden and Robert Fuller were members of the Stud Stable, managed by Ron Fuller in Southeastern Championship Wrestling, later Continental Championship Wrestling, throughout the early 1980s. He was heel most of the time, while his cousins occasionally were face. Pensacola, Florida and Mobile, Alabama were his stomping grounds in the early 1980s. The Stud Stable under Robert Fuller performed in the CWA in Memphis in 1988-1989.

Among their feuds during this time were The Rock 'n' Roll Express, Steve Armstrong and Tracy Smothers, Tommy and Johnny Rich and Kerry and Kevin Von Erich. He also teamed with Dennis Hall as "The Avengers" in the early 1970s.

In 1982, Golden briefly worked for Joe Blanchard's Southwest Championship Wrestling. He joined the newly founded Smoky Mountain Wrestling in 1991. He competed at the Volunteer Slam tournament on May 22, 1992 in Knoxville for the company's heavyweight championship, but was eliminated by Robert Gibson in the first round. He went on to feud with Gibson, which turned into a tag team feud when Jimmy's partner Robert Fuller joined the promotion while Ricky Morton arrived to join Gibson. This rekindled the Stud Stable versus Rock 'n' Roll Express feud from the 1980s. Golden continued to wrestle for the promotion through 1993.

In 1994, Golden followed Fuller to World Championship Wrestling (WCW) where Fuller was the manager "Col. Rob Parker" and wrestled for him as Bunkhouse Buck. He feuded mainly with Dustin Rhodes and then teamed with Dick Slater to win the WCW World Tag Team Titles. By 1997, he had left WCW for the independent circuit again.

Golden appeared on the July 16, 2010, episode of WWE SmackDown, portraying the character of Jack Swagger's father, and Swagger abandoned him to be chokeslammed and tombstoned by Kane. He returned on the September 3, episode of SmackDown, reprising his role as Jack Swagger's father, and was again left by Swagger to be attacked by Montel Vontavious Porter.

On August 30, 2011 in New Tazewell, Tennessee, Golden became the Tennessee Mountain Wrestling Heavyweight Champion.

Personal life
Golden married Patricia Ward in the 1970s. He trained to their son, Bobby Golden, in wrestling with TMW.

Championships and accomplishments
All-American Wrestling
AAW Tag Team Championship (1 time) – with Wild Samoan
All-Star Championship Wrestling
ASCW Heavyweight Championship (4 times)
ASCW Tag Team Championship (2 times) – with Thad Clark and Keith Hart
Cajun Wrestling Federation
CWF Heavyweight Championship (1 time)
Capital Pro Wrestling
CPW Tag Team Championship (1 time) - with The Gladiator 
Continental Wrestling Federation
CWF Tag Team Championship (2 times) - with The Mongolian Stomper (1) and Brian Lee (1)
Championship Wrestling from Florida
NWA Florida Tag Team Championship (1 time) – with Ron Fuller
NWA Mid-America / Continental Wrestling Association
CWA Tag Team Championship (2 times) – with Robert Fuller
NWA Southern Tag Team Championship (Mid-America version) (1 time) – with Buddy Rose
NWA Tri-State Heavyweight Championship (Alabama version) (1 time)
NWA Tri-State Tag Team Championship (Alabama version) (1 time)  – with Ramon Perez
NWA World Tag Team Championship (Mid-America Version) (2 times) – with Dennis Hall
Georgia Championship Wrestling
NWA Macon Tag Team Championship (1 time) – with Robert Fuller
Heartland Wrestling Association
HWA Barroom Brawl Championship (1 time)
Iron Ring Wrestling
IRW Tag Team Championship (1 time) – with Eddie Golden
Mid-Atlantic Championship Wrestling
NWA Mid-Atlantic Heavyweight Championship (1 time)
NWA Rocky Top
NWA Rocky Top Heavyweight Championship (1 time)
Nationwide Championship Wrestling
NCW Heavyweight Championship (1 time)
Premiere Championship Wrestling
PCW Heavyweight Championship (1 time)
Southeastern Championship Wrestling
NWA Alabama Heavyweight Championship (1 time)
NWA Southeastern Heavyweight Championship (Northern Division) (8 times)
NWA Southeastern Tag Team Championship (15 times) – with Robert Ruller (7), Ricky Gibson (2), Rip Smith (1), Norvel Austin (1), Bob Roop (1), Randy Rose (1), Mongolian Stomper (1), and Brian Lee (1)
NWA Southeastern United States Junior Heavyweight Championship (2 times)
NWA Tennessee Tag Team Championship (1 time) – with Ricky Gibson
Southern Championship Wrestling
SCW Southern Heavyweight Championship (1 time)
Southern States Wrestling
SSW Heavyweight Championship (1 time)
SSW Television Championship (1 time)
SSW Tag Team Championship (1 time) – with G.Q. Strattus
Tennessee Mountain Wrestling
TMW Heavyweight Championship (3 times)
United Atlantic Championship Wrestling
UACW Tag Team Championship (1 time) - with Tim Horner
World Championship Wrestling
WCW World Tag Team Championship (1 time) – with Dick Slater
World Championship Wrestling (Australia)
NWA Austra-Asian Tag Team Championship (1 time) – with Austin Idol
World Class Wrestling Association
WCWA World Tag Team Championship (1 time) – with Robert Fuller
Wrestling Observer Newsletter
Worst Tag Team (1995) with Dick Slater

Notes
While this promotion operates out of the same region and uses some of the same regional championships, it isn't the same promotion that was once owned and operated by Jim Crockett, Jr. That Mid-Atlantic promotion was sold to Ted Turner in November 1988 and went on to be renamed World Championship Wrestling.
This promotion has no connection to the World Championship Wrestling promotion formerly owned by Ted Turner and purchased by World Wrestling Entertainment in 2001. It was an NWA affiliated promotion based out of Australia.

References

External links 
 

1950 births
American male professional wrestlers
Living people
People from Hickman County, Tennessee
Professional wrestlers from Tennessee
The Stud Stable members
20th-century professional wrestlers
21st-century professional wrestlers
NWA Austra-Asian Tag Team Champions
WCW World Tag Team Champions
NWA Macon Tag Team Champions